Omid Popalzay (born 25 January 1996 in Kabul) is an Afghan footballer who plays as a midfielder. He currently plays for Afghanistan national team.

Youth
Before joining Achilles '29 in 2015 Omid Popalzay played in the youth of SV Estria and N.E.C./FC Oss.

Career

Achilles '29
He signed in July 2015 his first professional contract for Achilles '29. He was signed to play for the second team of Achilles '29 but was given a change for the first team after he impressed. On 11 September 2015 he made his debut for Achilles '29 against Sparta Rotterdam. He scored his first goal in a 2–1 win against FC Den Bosch. One week after the win against FC Den Bosch he scored another goal and made an assist against Jong PSV with the end result being a 3–2 win for Achilles '29.

Australia and Belgium
In the beginning of 2019, Popalzay moved abroad to Australia and joined Adelaide Comets FC. In May 2019, he left the club to join Belgian club Sint-Eloois-Winkel.

Olimpia Grudziądz
On 11 August 2020, Popalzay signed a contract with Polish club Olimpia Grudziądz.

Chittagong Abahani
On 22 November 2021, Popalzay joined Bangladesh Premier League club Chittagong Abahani.

International career
Omid Popalzay was called up for the Afghan national team for the World Cup Qualification match against Singapore on 8 October 2015. They lost the match with 1–0 but Omid made his debut for his country. After this match he also played against Syria and Cambodia.

Career statistics

Club performance

Statistics accurate as of last match played on 9 November 2016.

1 Includes UEFA Champions League and UEFA Europa League matches.

2 Includes Johan Cruijff Shield matches.

International goals
Scores and results list Afghanistan's goal tally first.

Personal life
Popalzay holds both Dutch and Afghan passports.

References

External links

Living people
1996 births
Afghan footballers
Dutch footballers
Afghan emigrants to the Netherlands
Afghanistan international footballers
Afghan expatriate sportspeople in the Netherlands
Association football midfielders
Eerste Divisie players
II liga players
Achilles '29 players
Olimpia Grudziądz players
Dutch people of Pashtun descent
Footballers from Kabul
Afghan expatriate footballers
Expatriate soccer players in Australia
Expatriate footballers in Belgium
Expatriate footballers in Poland
Sint-Eloois-Winkel Sport players
FC Lienden players
Adelaide Comets FC players
Afghan expatriate sportspeople in Poland
Afghan expatriate sportspeople in Belgium
Afghan expatriate sportspeople in Australia
Afghan expatriate sportspeople in Bangladesh
Expatriate footballers in Bangladesh